Dilocerus marinonii is a species of beetle in the family Cerambycidae. It was described by Napp in 1980.

References

Compsocerini
Beetles described in 1980